The following is a table of all songs recorded by Tom Petty. The list only includes solo work.

Songs

Notes

References

Petty, Tom